Ethan Hardin (born 26 February 2003) is an English footballer who plays as a defender for MLS Next Pro side Inter Miami CF II as a member of the Inter Miami academy.

Career

Inter Miami CF II
Hardin made his league debut for the club on 8 August 2020, playing the entirety of a 2–1 away victory over Tormenta FC.

In his first season (2020), Hardin led the team in passing, with 741 (8th in League One), and in passing accuracy (90.7%). Hardin also had the second-most interceptions (25) and tied for a team-high 17 aerial duels won.

Inter Miami CF 
In Inter Miami's preseason home international friendly versus Peru's "La U" on 26 January 2022, Hardin made his first appearance as a second-half substitute, wearing #34 and playing the left centerback position in a 3-4-3 formation. In the 72-minute, Hardin, at 18 years old, became the youngest goal scorer in Inter Miami franchise history when he scored a brilliant bouncing header from a corner kick to cap off an Inter Miami 4–0 victory.

References

External links
Ethan Hardin at US Soccer Development Academy

2003 births
Living people
Inter Miami CF II players
USL League One players
American soccer players
Soccer players from Florida
Association football defenders
Sportspeople from West Palm Beach, Florida
MLS Next Pro players